Do gole kože is the eighth studio album by Serbian pop-folk singer Stoja. It was released 9 July 2008 under the record label Grand Production.

Track listing

References

2008 albums
Stoja albums
Grand Production albums